Catlett Creek is a creek in Wise County, Texas.

Location
The creek is located in Wise County, in central Texas. Its source is five miles north of Decatur, and it runs for twelve miles until it reaches Sweetwater Creek near Bluett.

History
In the 1840s and 1850s, it was the site of skirmishes between Native Americans and European settlers. The creek was also where Daniel Waggoner first settled in Wise County in the 1850s, later to establish his Waggoner Ranch.

See also
List of rivers of Texas

References

Wise County, Texas
Rivers of Texas